Javier Augustine "Jarvey" Ocampo Gayoso (born February 11, 1997) is a Filipino professional footballer who plays as a forward for Philippines Football League (PFL) club Kaya–Iloilo and the Philippines national team. He played in the collegiate level as a forward for Ateneo de Manila University.

Early life and education
Javier Gayoso, who is the son of professional basketball player Jayvee Gayoso, played basketball in his youth but eventually decided to focus on football, which he started playing at age 4. His mother introduced him to football in kindergarten and allowed him to participate in a football camp.

His maternal grandfather Ed Ocampo and maternal uncle Alvin Ocampo were both footballers.

Gayoso attended the Ateneo de Manila High School and is currently pursuing collegiate studies at the Ateneo de Manila University. Despite his decision to end his collegiate football stint in February 2020, he expressed intent to finish his studies. He plans to finish the first semester of that school year and take a leave of absence from Ateneo to concentrate on football.

High school and college career

High school
Gayoso played for the football and track/field teams of Ateneo de Manila High School where he achieved Gold Medals for the 200 meter dash, 400 meter dash, high jump, long jump, and was named MVP of UAAP Season 77 for Athletics.

Ateneo de Manila University
In the University Athletic Association of the Philippines (UAAP), Gayoso plays for the senior football team of the Ateneo de Manila University. He debuted in Season 78. Ateneo finished third in the elimination round and later lost to the University of the Philippines in the final. Gayoso was recognized as the top scorer of the season with 11 goals along with Paolo Salenga of the National University.

In Season 79, Gayoso helped Ateneo secure the UAAP football title by scoring the lone goal of the match. He was eventually named Best Striker and MVP of Season 79.  In Season 80 in 2018, he was again awarded best striker of the UAAP.  In Season 81 he scored the goal that led to extra time at the 90th minute. He also received his fourth best striker award with 12 goals scored and was named MVP of Season 81.

In February 2020, Gayoso announced that he would not play for Ateneo in Season 82, despite still having one year eligibility, deciding to pursue a professional career after his stint with the Philippine youth national team at the 2019 Southeast Asian Games.

Club career

Azkals Development Team

2020 PFL season
As part of Gayoso's announcement to prematurely end his collegiate career, he cited an opportunity to play football outside the Philippines as one of his reasons. He also disclosed as part of his preparations to play overseas that he would be playing for a local club. 

Gayoso joined the Azkals Development Team (ADT) of the Philippines Football League (PFL) for the 2020 season. Despite previously playing as a striker in college and youth-level competitions, he was listed as a defender for ADT which is mentored by Philippines national team coach Scott Cooper. Previously, Gayoso has also played as a defender for the Philippines at the 2019 Southeast Asian Games. He made his PFL debut in the league's first match of the season on October 28, a 1–0 loss to United City. He was named man of the match after scoring ADT's first-ever PFL goal on November 3, in a 2–0 win over Mendiola. He was man of the match again in their 5–0 win over Maharlika Manila on November 6, where he scored a brace and assisted Chima Uzoka twice. In their final match of the season, Gayoso's penalty kick sealed their 2–0 win over Stallion Laguna.

In December 2020, Gayoso and Cooper went to Thailand to complete a transfer deal with Muangthong United of Thai League 1. However, as of June 2021, the move apparently fell through.

2021 loan to Kaya–Iloilo
On June 13, 2021, PFL club Kaya–Iloilo announced their signing of Gayoso. He made his debut on June 26, coming on as a second-half substitute in the club's first ever AFC Champions League group stage match, a 4–1 loss to BG Pathum United.

2021 Copa Paulino Alcantara
On August 6, 2021, Kaya announced that Gayoso would return to ADT. In the 2021 Copa Paulino Alcantara group stage, he scored five goals in their 9–0 thrashing of Mendiola, setting the competition's record for most goals by a player in a single match. He also scored in the semi-final against Stallion Laguna, but suffered a hamstring injury late in the match. This made him miss the final, which ADT lost to Kaya. Nonetheless, his total of six goals won him the Golden Boot award.

Kaya–Iloilo
On February 8, 2022, Kaya–Iloilo announced the signing of Gayoso.

International career

Youth
For most of his youth career, Gayoso played as a forward. Gayoso was part of the Philippine national under-19 team that took part in the 2016 AFC U-19 Championship qualifiers in 2015. He scored the national team's solitary goal in the campaign during the 2–1 loss to Laos.

He was a member of the Philippine under-22 team that participated in the 2017 Southeast Asian Games. In that stint, he scored a brace against East Timor. The Philippines finished fourth out of six in their group and were unable to advance to the knockout rounds.

In March 2019, Gayoso played for the Philippines in the qualifiers for the 2020 AFC U-23 Championship. He scored a brace in the first half of the match against Laos; however, the Laotians managed to come back and win 3–2. Gayoso's goals were the only ones scored by the Philippines in the qualifiers as they crashed out without a single win.

Gayoso took part in the Southeast Asian Games again in the 2019 edition which was hosted at home. He almost did not make the final squad but his college coach Jaypee Merida helped him work on his weaknesses. For this edition of the regional games, he played out-of-position as a right-back. National team coach Scott Cooper, is a proponent of Gayoso's shift from playing as a striker to a defender.

Senior
In November 2017, Gayoso received his first call-up to play for the senior national team which played at the 2017 CTFA International Tournament, a friendly tournament in Taiwan. The squad was led by Marlon Maro in lieu of head coach Thomas Dooley. He earned his first senior cap on December 1, 2017, appearing as a starter in the 3–1 win against Laos.

International goals
Scores and results list the Philippines' goal tally first.

Career Statistics

Club

Personal life
The younger Gayoso's grandfather was Ed Ocampo, a former football player and a recipient of the Mr. Football Award. Ed Ocampo also played and excelled in basketball. He later became a member of the national basketball team and a coach in the Philippine Basketball Association. Alvin Ocampo, a former national football team player, is Gayoso's uncle.

Honors
Azkals Development Team
Copa Paulino Alcantara runner-up: 2021

Individual
Copa Paulino Alcantara Golden Boot: 2021

References

1997 births
Ateneo de Manila University alumni
University Athletic Association of the Philippines footballers
Philippines international footballers
Living people
Association football forwards
Filipino footballers
Competitors at the 2019 Southeast Asian Games
Association football defenders
Azkals Development Team players
Kaya F.C. players
Southeast Asian Games competitors for the Philippines